Claude Bartolone (born 1951) is a Tunisian-born French politician who was President of the National Assembly of France from 2012 to 2017. A member of the Socialist Party, he was first elected to the National Assembly, representing the Seine-Saint-Denis department, in 1981. He served in the government as Delegate Minister for the City from 1998 to 2002, and he was President of the Seine-Saint-Denis General Council from 2008 to 2012.

Biography

Early life 
He was born on 29 July 1951 in Tunis, Tunisia. His mother was from Malta and his father from Sicily; both his parents were working-class. At the age of nine, he moved to Le Pré-Saint-Gervais in France and grew up in a council estate. After he was encouraged by a teacher named Marie-Thérèse Thoullieux not to get a professional degree, he attended the Lycée Turgot in Paris. He received a Bachelor of Science in Mathematics.

Career

Local mandates 
He was a municipal councillor of Le Pré-Saint-Gervais from 1977 to 1983, and from 1995 to 2008. He served as Deputy Mayor of Le Pré-Saint-Gervais from 1977 to 1983, from June to October 1995, as Mayor from 1995 to 1998, and again as Deputy Mayor from 2001 to 2008. He was also municipal councillor of Les Lilas from 1983 to 1989.

He served as Seine-Saint-Denis general councillor from 1979 to 1992, and has served again since 2008. From 1985 to 1992, he served as vice-president of the Seine-Saint-Denis General Council, and as president from 2008 to 2012. From 1998 to 2002, he served as regional councillor of Ile-de-France.

National mandates 
He served as a member of the National Assembly for the sixth district, encompassing Seine-Saint-Denis from 1981 to 1998.  From 1998 to 2002, he served as Delegate Minister for the City. Since 2002, he has served as member of the National Assembly again.

Following the June 2012 parliamentary election, in which the Socialist Party won a parliamentary majority, Bartolone was designated as the Socialist candidate for the post of President of the National Assembly. In the vote, held on 26 June 2012, Bartolone was accordingly elected to the post, receiving 298 votes against 185 votes for the Union for a Popular Movement (UMP) candidate Bernard Accoyer, who held the post during the preceding parliamentary term.

|- bgcolor="#E9E9E9" align="center"
! rowspan="2" colspan="2" align="left" | Candidates
! rowspan="2" colspan="2" align="left" | Parties
! colspan="2" | Socialist Primary
! colspan="2" | First round
|- bgcolor="#E9E9E9" align="center"
! width="60" | Votes
! width="30" | %
! width="60" | Votes
! width="30" | %
|- bgcolor="#E9E9E9" align="center"
|-
| bgcolor="" |
| align="left" | Bernard Accoyer
| align="left" | Union for a Popular Movement (Union pour un mouvement populaire)
| UMP
|colspan=2 | 
| 185
| 38.30%
|-
| bgcolor="" |
| align="left" | Claude Bartolone
| align="left" | Socialist Party (Parti socialiste)
| PS
| 127
| 49.22%
| 298
| 61.70%
|-
| bgcolor="" |
| align="left" | Jean Glavany
| align="left" | Socialist Party (Parti socialiste)
| PS
| 59
| 22.87%
|colspan=2 | 
|-
| bgcolor="" |
| align="left" | Élisabeth Guigou
| align="left" | Socialist Party (Parti socialiste)
| PS
| 50
| 19.38%
|colspan=2 | 
|-
| bgcolor="" |
| align="left" | Daniel Vaillant
| align="left" | Socialist Party (Parti socialiste)
| PS
| 22
| 8.53%
|colspan=2 | 
|}

From 2012 to 2017, he has served as President of the National Assembly of France. Thus, he lived in the Hôtel de Lassay.

In April 2013, he received a menacing letter containing ammunition powder, suggesting he should stop supporting same-sex marriage.

Personal life
He is married, in a second marriage, with Véronique Ragusa, a parliamentary collaborator. He resides in a 320 square metre mansion on the outskirts of Paris.

Honours

Foreign Honours 
  : Grand Cross of the Order of Merit of the Italian Republic (19/11/2012)

References

|-

|-

1951 births
Living people
French people of Maltese descent
French people of Sicilian descent
French people of Italian descent
Tunisian people of Sicilian descent
Knights Grand Cross of the Order of Merit of the Italian Republic
People from Tunis
Tunisian people of Italian descent
Tunisian people of Maltese descent
Presidents of the National Assembly (France)
Deputies of the 12th National Assembly of the French Fifth Republic
Deputies of the 13th National Assembly of the French Fifth Republic
Deputies of the 14th National Assembly of the French Fifth Republic